The Vanniyar, also spelled Vanniya, formerly known as the Palli, are a Dravidian community or jāti found in the northern part of the Indian state of Tamil Nadu. From the 19th century, peasant castes typically classified under Shudra category, such as Vanniyars have made mythical claims that their ancestor was born from the flames of a fire sacrifice. Certain Merchant and Artisan castes have fire born myths as well. Many Lower castes use a process of Sanskritisation to get upward mobility by creating such fire myths. Vanniyars, historically considered a lower caste, have been trying to gain upward mobility since 19th century to move away from lower status using these Agnikula myths.

Etymology
Several etymologies for Vanniyar have been suggested, including the Sanskrit vahni ("fire"), the Dravidian val ("strength"), or the Sanskrit or Pali vana ("forest"). The term Palli is widely used to describe them, but is considered to be derogatory.

Alf Hiltebeitel notes that the Vanniyars derive their caste name from Vahni. Vahni itself is thought to yield the Tamil word Vanni (fire), which is also a Tamil name for an important tree. The connection to the sage leads to further associations with mythological legends.

Historical status
Hiltebeitel, who classifies the Vanniyar as Shudra in the Hindu varna system, notes that South Indian society traditionally recognised neither the Kshatriya (warrior) nor Vaishya (provider) varnas, being divided instead between Brahmins on the one hand and Shudras and untouchables on the other. Nonetheless, communities in the region frequently sought to prove a historic higher status, based on myth or occasionally probable history. He notes that "traditions of demotion from a once higher rank are a commonplace of South Indian caste mythologies". Edgar Thurston noted that at his time, the Vanniyars, then called Pallis, were mainly agricultural servants of Vellalars, and had only recently started making claims to higher status. Researcher Lloyd I. Rudolph notes that as early as in 1833, the Vanniyar had ceased to accept their "low caste" status, also described as being Shudra by Christophe Jaffrelot and Kathleen Gough. Gough, however, documenting her fieldwork of 1951–53, records the Palli and the Vanniyar as separate but similar cultivating castes.

Sanskritisation movement
The Pallis tried to get an order in Pondicherry that by descent they were not a low agricultural caste. In preparation for the 1871 Indian census they petitioned to be recognised as being of the Kshatriya varna. They formed a number of caste organisations using their preferred name, with the Vanniyakula Kshatriya Maha Sangam appearing in Madras in 1888 and extending state-wide in 1952. By 1931, due to their successful politicking (a process known as Sanskritisation), the term Palli was removed from the Madras census, with the term Vanniya Kula Kshatriya appearing instead. The reinvention of their history through Sanskritisation, and thus the change in their status to Vanniyar rather than Palli, was evidenced in the community adopting such practices as vegetarianism and prohibiting the remarriage of widows, and what Rudolph terms a "radically revisionist history" was supported by claims of descent from the ancient Pallava dynasty.

According to Hiltebeitel, whilst the mythological claims of origin from the fire lend credence to their demand for being deemed as Kshatriyas, the claims to military origins and Kshatriya identity did not solely rely on myths. He notes that they had historically adopted various titles and terms that signified a self-image of Kshatriya status, including the Vanniyar name itself, and that

The caste has also been significant in the practices relating to worship of Draupaudi Amman, together with the Konars and Vellalar Mudaliars, and quite possibly were the instigators of it, with the other two communities being later adopters. The Vanniyar practice of polyandry was perhaps related to their adoption of the cult.

In addition to domestic slavery, there were a number of agricultural labor relationships. According to Ravi Ahuja, Paraiyar or Vanniyar farmhands sometimes called  were collectively bound to their home village soil. Vanniyar's mobility was severely restricted but the powers exercised by their masters were also limited - such slaves cannot be expelled or transferred to another village, even if the masters left the region themselves. As Dharma Kumar, argues the term slavery does not adequately describe the many forms of bondage existing within the traditional agrarian society. Caste involved a number of slavery-like criteria, like restriction of freedom, forced labor and ownership.

Current status
Rudolph noted that, although "necessarily tentative" because of being based on figures from the 1931 census, the Vanniyars in the 1980s constituted around 10% of the population of Tamil Nadu, being particularly prevalent in the northernmost districts of Chingelput, North Arcot, South Arcot and Salem, where they formed around 25% of the population. Traditionally, most Vanniyars are agricultural labourers but they are increasingly benefiting from political influence and organisation and they now own 50 per cent of the lands of the traditional landowners.

Upper castes Reddiars, Naidus, and Mudaliyars transferred their land holdings to Vanniyars as they moved to urban areas. Vanniyars, until then, rarely owned houses in the upper-caste neighborhood. Most Vanniyars remain either marginal farmers cultivating small areas of land or landless labourers. However, they have been hurt significantly by the rising debt crisis engulfing Tamil Nadu agriculture, and many now work as day labourers in Bengaluru and Chennai.

Due to their population size and concentration, the Vanniyars wield significant political clout in northern Tamil Nadu. The Pattali Makkal Katchi (PMK) is a political party was formed by S. Ramadoss from the Vanniyar Sangam, a caste association. It has been known on occasion for its violent protests against Dalits and draws its support base from Vanniyars. The Vanniyars who previously were of the Backward Class category, were now designated as a Most Backward Caste after successful agitations by them in the 1980s entitling them to 20% reservations. The reason for the agitation and subsequent re-classification was to avail more government benefits for the community. In 2020, the PMK launched an agitation to obtain 20% reservation solely for Vanniyars and forced the Tamil Nadu government to institute a caste census.

Notable people
 S. S. Ramasamy Padayachi, founder of the Tamil Nadu Toilers' Party
 S. Ramadoss, founder of the Pattali Makkal Katchi
 Anbumani Ramadoss, former Minister of Health and Family Welfare (2004–2009)
Kaduvetti Guru, leader of the Vanniyar Sangam and PMK politician
Auto Shankar, gangster
N. Santhanam popular actor and comedian

See also
Draupadi cult

References
Notes

Citations

Further reading

 
Social groups of Tamil Nadu